Maciej Przepiórkiewicz (born November 14, 1987) is a Polish weightlifter in the 56 kg weight division.

He finished 11th at the 2011 European Weightlifting Championships, with a total of 240 kg.
He also finished 7th at the 2012 European Weightlifting Championships.

References 

Living people
1987 births
Polish male weightlifters
Place of birth missing (living people)
21st-century Polish people